is a Japanese footballer who plays for Kashiwa Reysol.

Club statistics
Updated to 24 February 2019.

References

External links

Profile at Sagan Tosu

1993 births
Living people
University of Tsukuba alumni
Association football people from Tochigi Prefecture
Japanese footballers
J1 League players
Sagan Tosu players
Kashiwa Reysol players
Association football defenders